Adam Obidziński (born 23 December 1929 in Warsaw, Poland; died 21 August 1985 in Warsaw, Poland) was a Polish engineer and scientist, and co-founder of Meteor project.

Born in the noble family bearing Dąbrowa coat of arms, graduate of Warsaw School of Technology. Awarded many times for his work on the Meteor project and held an invention patent for innovative, and widely used "rescue line delivery rocket system".

Awards 
 Knight's Cross of the Order of Polonia Restituta
 Bronze Medal of Merit for National Defence
1974: Medal of the 30th Anniversary of People's Poland

References

1929 births
1985 deaths
20th-century Polish engineers